USBC may refer to:

United States Ballroom Championships, now the United States Dance Championships
United States Bankruptcy Code
United States Bankruptcy Court
United States Barista Championship
United States Bowling Congress
 The United States Bridge Championship, organised by the United States Bridge Federation
University of Surrey Boat Club, England
 USB-C connector for electronic devices

See also
United States Barber coinage
United States Bureau of the Census